This is the discography of English singer Ella Henderson. Her debut studio album, Chapter One, was released in October 2014. The album spent its first week of release at number one on the UK Albums Chart. The album includes the singles "Ghost", "Glow", "Yours" and "Mirror Man". Her debut extended play, Glorious, was released in November 2019. The EP includes the singles "Glorious", "Young" and "Friends".

Studio albums

Extended plays

Singles

As lead artist

As featured artist

Promotional singles

Other charted songs

Guest appearances

Songwriting credits

Notes

See also
For other songs by Ella Henderson, see List of songs recorded by Ella Henderson.

References

Discographies of British artists